Fatal dog attacks are human deaths caused by dogs. The study of fatal dog attacks can lead to prevention techniques which can help to reduce all dog bite injuries, not only fatalities. Dog bites and attacks can result in pain, bruising, wounds, bleeding, soft tissue injury, broken bones, loss of limbs, scalping, disfigurement, life-threatening injuries, and death.

Causes of death in dog bite related fatalities

There are several ways a person can die from a dog bite or a dog attack, including:
 Air embolism
 Blunt force trauma, usually to the head, is more common with infants or small children
 Broken neck
 Decapitation, the removal of the head or brain from the rest of the spine
 Heart attack brought on by exertion during a dog attack, from loss of blood pressure due to bleeding, from the stress of an attack, or resultant injuries
 Hemorrhage/exsanguination, loss of blood through severing an artery or vein, or from bleeding out from multiple wounds, or bleeding for an excessive time before victim is found
 Sepsis from bite wounds

Published studies 

Scientists, scholars, medical personnel, veterinarians, and lawmakers have been documenting the societal problem of fatal dog attacks for several decades in an effort to identify causes and come up with solutions.

2013 study: Journal of the American Veterinary Medical Association 

The most recent study of the epidemiology of fatal dog bites in the United States was published in the Journal of the American Veterinary Medical Association (AVMA) in 2013. While earlier studies were based on television and newspaper reports, this was the first study to be based on law-enforcement reports, animal control reports, and investigator statements. It identified preventable factors in the fatal incidents. They found that the most common contributing factors were: absence of an able-bodied person to intervene, no familiar relationship of victims with dogs, owner failure to neuter dogs, compromised ability of victims to interact appropriately with dogs (e.g. mental disabilities), dogs kept isolated from regular positive human interactions versus family dogs (e.g. dogs kept chained in backyards), owners' prior mismanagement of dogs, and owners' history of abuse or neglect of dogs. Furthermore, they found that in 80% of the incidents, 4 or more of the above factors co-occurred.

The authors found that in a significant number of DBRFs there was either a conflict between different media sources reporting breed and/or a conflict between media and animal control reports relative to the reporting of breed. For 401 dogs described in various media accounts of DBRFs, media sources reported conflicting breed attributions for 124 of the dogs (30.9%); and where there were media reports and an animal control report (346 dogs), there were conflicting breed attributions for 139 dogs (40.2%)

According to this study, reliable verification of the breed of dog was only possible in 18% of incidents.

2009 study: Wilderness & Environmental Medicine 

This 27-year study published in the Wilderness & Environmental Medicine, collected data from the CDC Wide-Ranging OnLine Data for Epidemiologic Research (CDC WONDER) program. It looked at cases in which the cause of death according to International Classification of Diseases (ICD) codes was dog bites. It did not include fatalities secondary to an infection from a bite. During those 27 years, 504 deaths due to dog bites were reported (an average of 18.67 per year) to have occurred in every state except North Dakota. Six states (Texas, California, Florida, Illinois, Georgia and North Carolina) accounted for 37% of the reported cases (but they also compose 36% of the US population). The number of deaths per capita were highest in Alaska (11.83 deaths per 10 million inhabitants); the rest of the states ranged from 0 to 2.56 deaths per 10 million population. Most fatal dog bites occur in young children and the elderly. Elderly victims have a higher in-hospital fatality rate after the trauma compared to younger victims.

The study indicated that, in the US, incidents of dog-related injury and death increased along with the increases in dog and human populations. Males and children comprised the majority of fatal dog attacks, with children under age 10 representing 70% of deaths from dog bites from 1979 to 1988.  Males comprised 58.1% of the reported cases whereas females comprised 41.9%, compared to the US population with 48.87% males and 51.13% females. With respect to race percentages of victims, 81.3% were white (M: 46.8%, F: 34,5%), 14.3% were black (M: 8.5%, F: 5.7%) and 4.4% were listed as "other".  When compared to the US population, there was no significant difference in frequency of dog-related deaths in relation to race; the study indicated the percentages of dog ownership to be 92% white, 3% black and 3% other races; however, it is important to note that most of the available data did not report the race of the victim.

At the time of the study, some of the limitations included the lack of information regarding many important factors about the reported attacks, such as the activity that was taking place at the time, whether or not it was provoked, a positive identification of the dog's breed, size and whether it was neutered or spayed, the health of the dog and victim, location of the wounds and other relative information.  There is also the possibility that a few of the reported dog bite deaths had been miscoded or possibly omitted in cases where the cause of death was secondary to the bite.  A mandatory national registration system on all animal attacks with detailed information was advised in an effort to provide more insight into the factors leading up to the attack.

2000 study by CDC, HSUS & AVMA 

A joint project between researchers in the Centers for Disease Control and Prevention (CDC), Humane Society of the United States (HSUS) and American Veterinary Medical Association (AVMA), this study published in 2000 evaluated 20 years (1979-1998) of fatalities by using 18-years of data collected previously for similar studies, newly identified data from media reports for 1997-1998, and a database from HSUS. The purpose was to summarize breeds associated with reported human DBRF during a 20-year period and assess policy implications.

The authors postulated that the resulting tabulations by breed may be biased due to four factors: that their method of searching for DBRFs by using NEXIS to locate media reports was likely to only discover about 74% of the actual incidents; that dog attacks involving certain breeds may be more likely to have received media coverage in the first place; that identifications of the dog's breed is often subjective (causing possible misreporting of breed); and that the researchers weren't sure how to account for crossbreed dogs (more than one breed in a single dog).

The study defined dog attacks as "a human death caused by trauma from a dog bite". Excluded from the study were deaths by disease caused by dog bites, strangulation on a scarf or leash pulled by a dog, heart attacks or traffic accident, and falling injury or fire ant bites from being pushed down by a dog. The study also excluded four deaths by trauma from dog bites by police dogs or guard dogs employed by the government.

After excluding approximately 90 deaths from the study because no breed information was available, the researchers ended up with 238 deaths for their 20-year analysis representing 25 breeds of dog, or 227 deaths for which they had additional data for analysis. Using the 227 collection: 133 (58%) were unrestrained dogs and on the owners' property; 55 (24%) were loose off the owners' property; 38 (17%) were restrained dogs on their owners' property; and only one (less than 1%) was restrained off the owners' property.

The authors expressed disappointment that they could not adequately evaluate a "risk rate" for each dog breed (number of fatalities divided by the number of dogs), citing unavailability of population figures for each breed. Instead, they simply tabulated the fatalities by breed. Despite that limitation, the data indicated that Rottweilers and pit bull-type dogs accounted for 67% of human DBRF in the United States between 1997 and 1998, and followed with "It is extremely unlikely that they accounted for anywhere near 60% of dogs in the United States during that same period and, thus, there appears to be a breed-specific problem with fatalities."

In the 20 years from 1979 to 1998, the breeds of dogs involved were as follows:

Death-based approach (each breed counted only once per fatal incident): Pit bull-type 76; Rottweiler 44; German Shepherd 27; Husky-type 21; Malamute 15; Wolf-dog 14; Mixed-breed 12; Chow 11; Doberman 10; St. Bernard 8; Great Dane 7; Labrador 5; Akita 4; 3 each of Sled dog, Bulldog, Mastiff, Boxer, Collie; 2 each of Bullmastiff, Hound-type; 1 each of Retriever-type, Chesapeake Bay Retriever, West Highland Terrier, Terrier-type, Japanese Hunting Dog, Newfoundland, Coonhound, Sheepdog, Australian Shepherd, Rhodesian Ridgeback, Cocker Spaniel.

Dog-based approach (each dog counted, even in multi-dog fatal incidents): Pit bull-type 118; Rottweiler 67; Mixed-breed 47; German Shepherd 41; Chow 21; Husky-type 21; Malamute 16; Wolf-dog 15; Doberman 13; Great Dane 13; Sled-dog 12; Labrador 8; St. Bernard 8; Collie 6; Boxer 5; Mastiff 5; Akita 4; Bulldog 3; Australian Shepherd 3; Bullmastiff 2; Hound-type 2; and 1 each of Chesapeake Bay Retriever, Cocker Spaniel, Coonhound, Japanese Hunting Dog, Newfoundland, Retriever-type, Rhodesian Ridgeback, Sheepdog, Terrier-type, West Highland Terrier.

The authors attempted to evaluate efficacy of breed-specific legislation (BSL) as well as generic non-breed-specific dangerous dog laws, listed some of the difficulties of enforcement and touched on several of the factors, but did not have any recommendations — citing that they were unaware of any formal evaluation of effectiveness of BSL or general non-BSL dangerous dog laws in preventing fatal or nonfatal dog bites.

Some other recommendations by the authors included:
 
 Regulate individual dogs and owners on the basis of their behavior
 Enact stringent animal control laws and increase enforcement
 Enact dangerous dog laws that place primary responsibility for a dog’s behavior on the owner
 Target chronically irresponsible dog owners
 Encourage dog owners to seek professional help in training and socializing their pets
 Enforce leash laws
 Enforce laws against dog fighting
 Evaluate the effects of regulations that limit fences to heights insufficient for controlling large dogs
 Educate owners with respect to selection of breed, decisions to neuter/spay their dogs, and importance of socializing dogs
 Add education in schools and adult-education programs about bite prevention and canine care
 Improve surveillance and reporting for fatal and nonfatal dog bites, including collecting details of event, circumstances and the dogs and parties involved
 Collect data on the entire dog population for comparison/percentage purposes
 Maintain adequate funding for animal control agencies

1997 study by Centers for Disease Control and Prevention and HSUS 

Collecting data from HSUS, Nexis and death certificates, this 1997 write-up analysed 279 USA dog-bite related deaths from 1979-1994, briefly mentioned three specific cases from 1995-1996, and tabulated breed-specific data from 1979-1996.

Of the 199 incidents in which breed was known, the report tabulates the breeds by most fatalities first, presenting: Pit bull 60, Rottweiler 29, German shepherd 19, Husky 14, Malamute 12, Doberman 8, Chow 8, Great Dane 6, St. Bernard 4, Akita 4.

For crossbreeds, they present: Wolf hybrid 14, German shepherd 11, Pit bull 10, Husky 6, Malamute 3, Rottweiler 3, Chow 3.

The report suggested improvements in three categories for preventing dog bites: owner and public education, better enforcement by animal control, and better bite reporting for future analyses.

1982 study by University of Texas and Children's Medical Center, Dallas 

A study conducted at the University of Texas Southwestern Medical School identified 74 fatal dog bites during the period 1966–1980 from news media and medical literature.

Summary of some of the findings:

 The dogs were owned by the victim's family in 38 cases and a neighbor in 25 cases.
 The dogs were mostly described as pets or family dogs, and in 29 cases prior behavior was specifically stated as friendly or without viciousness. Only three of the dogs were considered guard dogs and two known to have prior bite histories.
 In 64 out of the 74 cases the location of attack was within or adjacent to a home or yard.
 Of the 23 victims less than one year in age, 22 occurred inside a home, and in 16 cases both child and dog lived there.
 In most cases the dog was not provoked, and in many instances the dog knew the victim.
 Dogs were either killed on scene or quarantined for rabies (all negative), and "once subdued, no further viciousness by the dogs was reported in any case."
 Only 16 breeds of dog were represented in the 74 cases: German Shepherd 16, Mixed breed 10, Husky 9, St. Bernard 8, Bullterrier (pit bull) 6, Great Dane 6, Malamute 5, Unknown breed 5, Golden Retriever 3, Boxer 2, Dachshund 2, Doberman Pinscher 2, Collie 2, Rottweiler 1, Basenji 1, Chow Chow 1, Labrador Retriever 1, Yorkshire Terrier 1.
 When comparing number of deaths by each particular breed to the number of registrations of that breed, the authors wrote: "German shepherds were involved in more deaths (16) than any other breed, but German shepherds have the highest registration (74,723) of any large breed according to the American Kennel Club. The greater number of deaths may simply reflect a larger population. In relation to its small registration (929) the bullterrier (pit bull) was responsible for the highest number of deaths (6), but the popularity of this breed may be increasing and, therefore, its population might not be reflected by its registration."

1977 study by Centers for Disease Control and Prevention 

The first epidemiological study of dog-bite fatalities in the United States was conducted by an epidemiologist with the Centers for Disease Control and Prevention (CDC) in 1977.

The study covers eleven fatality cases. Based on circumstances in each case, the author theorizes that most of the fatalities were territorial issues (in the dog's mind). He also concludes that most fatal attacks by dogs were initiated with intent to kill. He concludes this by comparing the 75% of these cases of attack by a single dog (which attacked the head and neck) to the statistic that 75% of nonfatal attack wounds are being inflicted on extremities (which are not usually fatal).

The author also rues the lack of "comprehensive surveillance" of dog bite related fatalities, and counsels that fatalities should be examined to determine the magnitude of the problem and to identify causative factors which can be eliminated to reduce fatalities.

References

 
Canid attacks